Matrikas (Sanskrit: मातृका (singular), IAST: mātṝkās, lit. "divine mothers") also called Matar or Matri, are a group of mother goddesses who are always depicted together in Hinduism. The Matrikas are often depicted in a group of seven, the Saptamatrika(s) (Seven Mothers). However, they are also depicted as a group of eight, the Ashtamatrika(s).

In the Brihat Samhita, Varahamihira says that "Mothers are to be made with cognizance of (different major Hindu) gods corresponding to their names." They are associated with these gods as their spouses or their energies (Shaktis). Brahmani emerged from Brahma, Vaishnavi from Vishnu, Maheshvari from Shiva, Indrani from Indra, Kaumari from Skanda, Varahi from Varaha and Chamunda from Devi. and additionals are Narasimhi from Narasimha and Vinayaki from Ganesha.

Originally believed to be a personification of the seven stars of the star cluster the Pleiades, they became quite popular by the seventh century and a standard feature of goddess temples from the ninth century onwards. In South India, Saptamatrika worship is prevalent whereas the Ashtamatrika are venerated in Nepal, among other places.

The Matrikas assume paramount significance in the goddess-oriented sect of Hinduism, Tantrism. In Shaktism, they are described as "assisting the great Shakta Devi (goddess) in her fight with demons." Some scholars consider them Shaiva goddesses. They are also connected with the worship of warrior god Skanda. In most early references, the Matrikas are associated with the conception, birth, diseases and protection of children. They were seen as inauspicious and the "personification of perils", propitiated in order to avoid those ills, that carried off so many children before they reached adulthood. They come to play a protective role in later mythology, although some of their early inauspicious and wild characteristics continue in these legends. Thus, they represent the prodigiously fecund aspect of nature as well as its destructive force aspect.

Origins and development

Matris or Matrikas  originated from the  sweat of lord Shiva who chased the demons away from heaven when  the later invaded heaven  after defeating  devas.

According to Jagdish Narain Tiwari and Dilip Chakravati, the Matrikas were existent as early as the Vedic period and the Indus Valley civilization. Seals with rows of seven feminine deities or priestesses are cited as evidence for the theory. The Rigveda (IX 102.4) speaks of a group of seven Mothers who control the preparation of Soma, but the earliest clear description appears in select chapters of the epic Mahabharata dated to 1st century CE. Madhu Wangu believes that Matrika description in Mahabharata is rooted in the group of seven females depicted on Indus valley seals.

By the fifth century, all these goddesses were incorporated in mainstream orthodox Hinduism as Tantric deities. David Kinsley proposes that the Matrikas may be local village goddesses, who were being assimilated in the mainstream. He cites two reasons for his assertion: their description in Mahabharata as dark in colour, speaking foreign languages and living in "peripheral areas" and their association with god Skanda and his father, Shiva, who though Vedic has attributes. Sara L. Schastok suggests that the Matrikas maybe inspired by the concept of Yakshas, who are associated with Skanda and Kubera – both are often portrayed with the Matrikas. In contrast to the Indus valley origins theory, Bhattacharyya notes:

The Sapta-Matrikas were earlier connected with Skanda (Kumara) and in later times, associated with the sect of Shiva himself. During the Kushana period (1st to 3rd century), the sculptural images of the matrikas first appear in stone. The Kushana images merged from the belief in Balagraha (lit "destroyers of children") worship related to conception, birth, diseases and protection of children. The Balagraha tradition included the worship of the infant Skanda with the Matrikas. The goddesses were considered as personifications of perils, related to children and thus, were pacified by worship. The Kushana images emphasize the maternal as well as destructive characteristics of the Matrikas through their emblems and weapons. They appear to be an undifferentiated sculptural group but develop in standard and complex iconographic representation during the following Gupta period.

In the Gupta period (3rd to 6th century A.D.), folk images of Matrikas became important in villages. The diverse folk goddesses of the soldiers like Matrikas were acknowledged by the Gupta rulers and their images were carved on royal monuments in order to strengthen the loyalty and adherence of the armed forces. The Gupta kings Skandagupta and Kumaragupta I (c. second half of fifth century) made Skanda (Kumara) their model and elevated the position of Skanda's foster mothers, the Matrikas from a cluster of folk goddesses to court goddesses. Since the fourth century, Parhari, Madhya Pradesh had a rock-cut shrine been solely devoted to the Sapta Matrika.

The Western Ganga Dynasty (350–1000 CE) kings of Karnataka built many Hindu temples along with saptamatrika carvings and memorials, containing sculptural details of saptamatrikas. The evidence of Matrika sculptures is further pronounced in the Gurjara–Patiharas (8th to 10th century CE) and Chandella period (8th to 12th century CE). The Chalukyas claimed to have been nursed by the Sapta Matrikas. It was a popular practice to link South Indian royal family lineage to a Northern kingdom in ancient times. During the Chalukya period (11th to 13th century), all Matrikas continued to figure among the deity sculptures of this period.

The Kadambas and Early Chalukyas from the fifth century praise the Matrikas in their preambles, as giver of powers to defeat enemies. In most of the relevant texts, their exact number has not been specified, but gradually their number and names became increasingly crystallized and seven goddesses were identified as matrikas, albeit some references indicate eight or even sixteen Matrikas. Laura K. Amazzone cites:

The inconsistency in the number of Matrikas found in the valley [Indus] today (seven, eight, or nine) possibly reflects the localization of goddesses [.]  Although the Matrikas are mostly grouped as seven goddesses over the rest of the Indian Subcontinent, an eighth Matrikas has sometimes been added in Nepal to represent the eight cardinal directions. In Bhaktapur, a city in the Kathmandu Valley, a ninth Matrika is added to the set to represent the center.

Iconography

The iconographical features of the Matrikas have been described in Hindu scriptures such as the Mahabharata, Puranas such as the Varaha Purana, Agni Purana, Matsya Purana, Vishnudharmottara Purana and Devi Mahatmya (part of the Markandeya Purana) and also in the Agamas such as the Amsumadbhedagama, Surabhedagama, Purvakarnagama and Rupamandana.

The Ashta-Matrikas as described in the Devi Mahatmya

 Brahmani or Brahmi is the Shakti (energy) of the creator god Brahma. She is depicted yellow in colour and with four heads. She may be depicted with four or six arms. Like Brahma, she holds a rosary or noose and kamandalu (water pot) or lotus stalk or a book or bell and is seated on a hamsa (identified with a swan or goose) as her vahana (mount or vehicle). She is also shown seated on a lotus with the hamsa on her banner. She wears various ornaments and is distinguished by her basket-shaped crown called . Her consort his Asithanga Bhairava
 Vaishnavi, the Shakti of the preserver-god Shri Vishnu, is described as seated on the Garuda (eagle-man) and having four or six arms. She holds Shankha (conch), chakra (Discus), mace and lotus and bow and sword or her two arms are in varada mudra (Blessing hand gesture) and abhaya mudra ("No-fear" hand gesture). Like Vishnu, she is heavily adorned with ornaments like necklaces, anklets, earrings, bangles etc. and a cylindrical crown called .Her consort his Krodha Bhairava
 Maheshwari is the power of god Shiva, also known as Maheshvara. Maheshvari is also known by the names Raudri, Rudrani, Maheshi and Shivani derived from Shiva's names Rudra, Mahesha, and Shiva. Maheshvari is depicted seated on Nandi (the bull) and has four or six hands. Her consort his Ruru Bhairava
 Indrani, also known as Aindri,, Mahendri and Vajri, is the power of the Indra, the Lord of the heaven. Seated on a charging elephant, Aindri, is depicted dark-skinned, with two or four or six arms. She is depicted as having two or three or like Indra, a thousand eyes. She is armed with the Vajra (thunderbolt), goad, noose and lotus stalk. Her consort his Kapala Bhairava
 Kaumari, also known as Kumari, Kartiki, Kartikeyani and Ambika is the power of Kartikeya, the god of war. Kaumari rides a peacock and has four or twelve arms. She holds a spear, axe, a Shakti (power) or Tanka (silver coins) and bow. She is sometimes depicted six-headed like Kartikeya and wears a cylindrical crown. Her consort his Chanda Bhairava 
 Varahi or Vairali also known as Verai, Dandini, Dhandai Devi is the power of Varaha, the third and the boar-headed form of Vishnu. She holds a Danda (rod of punishment) or plough, goad, a Vajra or a sword, and a Panapatra. Sometimes, she carries a bell, chakra, chamara (a yak's tail) and a bow. She wears a crown called  with other ornaments. Her consort his Unmatha Bhairava
 Chamunda, is also known as Chamundi and Charchika. She is very often identified with Kali and is similar in her appearance and habit. The identification with Kali is explicit in Devi Mahatmya. The black coloured Chamunda is described as wearing a garland of severed heads or skulls (Mundamala) and holding a Damaru (drum), trishula (trident), sword and pānapātra (drinking-vessel). Riding a jackal or standing on a corpse of a man (shava or preta), she is described as having three eyes, a terrifying face and a sunken belly. Her consort his Bheeshana Bhairava
 Narasimhi is the divine energy of Narasimha (the fourth and lion-man form of Vishnu). She is also called as Pratyangira, the woman-lion goddess who throws the stars into disarray by shaking her lion mane. Her consort his Samhara Bhairava

Though the first six are unanimously accepted by texts, the name and features of the seventh and eighth Matrika are disputed. In Devi-Mahatmya, Chamunda is omitted after the Saptamatrika list, while in sculpture in shrines or caves and the Mahabharata, Narasimhi is omitted. The Varaha Purana names Yami – the Shakti of Yama, as the seventh and Yogishwari as the eighth Matrika, created by flames emerging from Shiva's mouth. In Nepal, the eighth Matrika is called Mahalakshmi or Lakshmi is added omitting Narasimhi. In lists of nine Matrikas, Devi-Purana mentions Gananayika or Vinayaki – the Shakti of Ganesha, characterized by her elephant head and ability to remove obstacles like Ganesha and Mahabhairavi omitting Narasimhi.
The Female power Shakti called as Kalyani devi of the god Matsya the first and fish avatar of Vishnu is also included sometimes in central India. 
Devi Bhagvata Purana mentions 2 other Matrikas Varuni (shakti of Varuna), Kauberi (shakti of Kubera) and Narayani, (shakti of Narayana).

Legends

There are several Puranic texts related to the origin of Matrikas. Matsya Purana, Vamana Purana, Varaha Purana, Kurma Purana and the Suprabhedagama contain references to Matrikas, and this asserts their antiquity.

According to the Shumbha-Nishumbha story of Devi Mahatmya, Matrikas appear as Shaktis from the bodies of the gods – Brahma, Shiva, Skanda, Vishnu, Indra; having the form of each, approached Chandika (identified with Devi) with whatever form, ornaments and vehicle the god possessed. In that form, they slaughter the demon army. Thus, the Matrikas are goddesses of the battlefield. They are described as assistants of Durga having sinister as well as propitious characteristics. After the battle, the Matrikas dance drunk with their victim's blood. This description is repeated with little variation in Devi Bhagavata Purana and Vamana Purana. The Devi-Bhagavata Purana mentions three other goddesses, Shaktis of other gods' in addition to the Saptamatrika, making a group of 10 Matrikas.

According to latter episode of Devi Mahatmya, Durga created Matrikas from herself and with their help slaughtered the demon army. In this version, Kali is described as a Matrika, who sucked all the blood of demon Raktabija. Kali is given the epithet Chamunda in the text. When demon Shumbha challenges Durga to a single combat, she absorbs the Matrikas in herself and says that they are her different forms.In the Vamana Purana too, the Matrikas arise from different parts of Devi and not from male gods although they are described and named after the male deities.

In Matsya Purana, Shiva had created seven Matrikas to combat the demon Andhaka, who had the ability to duplicate from each drop of his blood that falls from him when he is wounded. The Matrikas drink up his blood and help Shiva defeat the demon. After the battle, the Matrikas begin a rampage of destruction by starting to devour other gods, demons and peoples of the world. Narasimha, Vishnu's man-lion incarnation, creates a host of thirty-two benign goddesses who calm down the terrible, fire-breathing Matrikas. Narasimha commanded the Matrikas to protect the world, instead of destroying it and thus be worshipped by mankind. At the end of the episode, Shiva's terrible form Bhairava is enshrined with the images of the Matrikas at the place where the battle took place. This story is retold in Vishnudharmottara Purana. Vishnudharmottara Purana further relates them with vices or inauspicious emotions like envy, pride, anger etc.

In Varaha Purana, they are created from the distracted mind of goddess Vaishnavi, who loses her concentration while doing asceticism. They are described as lovely and act as the goddesses' attendants on the battlefield. In the Bhagavata Purana, when beings created by Vishnu are enlisted; the Matrikas are listed with rakshasas (demons), bhutas (ghosts), pretas, dakinis and other dangerous beings. In the same text, milkmaids offer a prayer for protection of the infant-god Krishna from the Matrikas.

The Devi Purana (6th – 10th century) mentions a group of sixteen matrikas and six other types of Matrikas mentioned, apart from the Saptamatrikas. It introduces the Loka-matara (mothers of the world), a term used in the Mahabharata, in the very first chapter. Kind to all creatures, the Matrikas are said to reside in various places for the benefit of children. The text paradoxically describes the Matrikas as being created by various gods like Brahma, Vishnu, Shiva, Indra as well as being their mothers. Devi Purana describe a pentad of Matrikas, who help Ganesha to kill demons. The Matrikas direct the sage to perform worship of (interpreted as a Yantra or Mandala or a circular shrine to the Matrikas), established by Vishnu on the Vindhya mountains, by meat and ritual sacrifice.

Mahabharata

The Mahabharata narrates in different chapters the birth of warrior-god Skanda (the son of Shiva and Parvati) and his association with the Matrikas – his adopted mothers.

In one version, Indra (king of gods) sends the goddesses called "mothers of the world" to kill him. However, upon seeing Skanda, instead they follow their maternal instincts and raise him. In the chapter Vana-parva version, the Saptamatrikas are mentioned. Later in the Mahabharata; when absorption of these indigenous goddesses in the Brahmanic pantheon was initiated, a standardized group of seven goddesses – the Saptamatrikas, Shaktis or powers of Brahmanic gods are mentioned as Brahmi, Maheshvari, Kumari, Vaishnavi, Varahi, Indrani and Chamunda.

In other accounts of Skanda's birth in Mahabharata, eight ferocious goddesses emerge from Skanda, when struck by Indra's Vajra (thunderbolt). These are Kāki, Halimā, Mālinī, Āryā, Palālā and Vaimitrā, which Skanda accepted as his mothers, who stole other children – a characteristic of the Matrikas.

Another account mentions the Maha-matrikas (the great mothers), a group of the wives of six of the Saptarishis (7 great sages), who were accused of being Skanda's real mothers and thus abandoned by their husbands. They request Skanda to adopt them as his mothers. Skanda agrees and grants them two boons: to be worshipped as great goddesses and permission to torment children as long as they are younger than 16 years and then act as their protectors. These six goddesses as well as the Saptamatrikas are identified or associated with Vedic Krittikas, the constellation Pleiades.

The Shalya Parva of the Mahabharata mentions characteristics of a host of Matrikas, who serve Skanda. Ninety-two of them are named but the text says there exist more. The Shalya Parva describes them as young, cheerful, most of them fair but having dangerous features like long nails and large teeth. They are said to fight like Indra in battles, invoking terror in minds of enemies; speak different foreign tongues and lives in inaccessible places away from human settlements like crossroads, caves, mountains, springs, forests, riverbanks and cremation grounds. Notable among these lists of Matrikas is Putana, a goddess who tried to kill the infant Krishna (an incarnation of Vishnu) by suckling him with poisoned breast milk and consequently killed by Krishna.

Depictions

The textual description of Matrikas is generally frightening and ferocious. In the Mahabharata, all the seven mothers are described as fatal or serve as threats to foetuses or infants. They are described as living in trees, crossroads, caves and funeral grounds and they are terrible as well as beautiful. But, in the sculptural portrayal, they are depicted quite differently as protectors and benevolent mothers. They are armed with the same weapons, wear the same ornaments, and ride the same vahanas and carry the same banners as their corresponding male deities.

The Saptamatrkas are generally carved in relief on a rectangular stone slab in the sequential order of Brahmani, Maheshvari, Kumari, Vaishnavi, Varahi, Indrani and Chamunda, being flanked
by two male figures – a terrible form of Shiva (Virabhadra) and his son Ganesha in both sides (first – on their right and last – on their left). Thus, the Matrikas are considered Saivite goddesses. They are often depicted on the lintel slabs of the main door of a Shiva temple – mainly in the Jaunsar-Bawar region, with their respective mounts forming the pedestal. Sometimes, they are occupied by the couple Uma-Maheshvara (Parvati and Shiva). The earliest instance of their portrayal with Uma-Maheshvara is at Desha Bhattarika, Nepal although now the Matrika images have withered away. The 12th century Sanskrit author Kalhana mentions worship of Matrikas with Shiva in Kashmir, his work Rajatarangini.

Three panels of Saptamatrikas appear near the Shiva cave at Udayagiri, Bhopal. They are also depicted in the Shaiva caves of Elephanta and Ellora (Caves 21, 14, 16 and 22). In sixth century Rameshvara cave (Cave 21) at Ellora, "With the terrific aspect repressed entirely, the matrikas are depicted as benign and are worshipped in adulation. Sensuous, elegant, tender, beautiful adolescents, they are yet haughty and grand, quintessentially the creatrix." Karrtikkeyi (Kumari) is depicted with a child on her lap and even Varahi is depicted with a human head, rather than the usual boar one. In Ravana-ka-kai cave (Cave 14), each of the matrikas is with a child. In eighth century Kailash Temple (cave 16) – dedicated to Shiva – of Rashtrakuta period, the Matrikas appear on the southern boundary of the temple. As the influence of Tantra rose, the fertility area and upper parts of body in the Matrika sculptures were stressed.

In each of the four depictions at Ellora, the matrikas are accompanied by Virabhadra, Ganesha and also on their left (besides Ganesha) by Kala (Time personified or Death). The presence of Kala in form of a skeleton, seems to indicate the darker aspect of the matrikas' nature. At Osian, the Matrikas is flanked by Ganesha and Kubera (the treasurer of the gods and a devotee of Shiva) while Virabhadra sits in the middle of the group. In Gupta and post-Gupta art, like in 6th Century caves of Shamalaji, the Matrikas are accompanied by Shiva's son Skanda.

Associations

Yoginis

The Matrikas are included among the Yoginis, a group of sixty-four or eighty-one Tantric goddesses, in a tradition which treats the Yoginis as important deities, whereas another tradition, which views the Yoginis as cruel minor deities, considers them separate entities. In Sanskrit literature the Yoginis have been represented as the attendants or various manifestations of goddess Durga engaged in fighting with the demons Shumbha and Nishumbha, and the principal Yoginis are identified with the Matrikas. Other Yoginis are described as born from one or more Matrikas. The derivation of sixty-four Yoginis from eight Matrikas became a common tradition, by mid- 11th century. The Mandala (circle) and chakra of Yoginis were used alternatively. The eighty-one Yoginis evolve from a group of nine Matrikas, instead of seven or eight. The Saptamatrika (Brahmi, Maheshvari, Kumari, Vaishnavi, Varahi, Indrani and Chamunda) joined by Chandika and Mahalakshmi form the nine Matrika cluster. Each Matrika is considered to be a Yogini and is associated with eight other Yoginis resulting in the troupe of eighty-one (nine times nine); there is an 81-Yogini temple at Bhedaghat in Madhya Pradesh. Thus, Yoginis are considered as manifestations or daughters of the Matrikas.

The yoginis also occupy an important place in Tantra, with 64-Yogini temples across India including the well-preserved ones at Ranipur-Jharial and Hirapur in Odisha. The rise of the Yogini cult is analogous to the rise of the Matrikas' cult. Bhattacharyya sums it this way: "The growing importance of Shaktism [of the matrikas and yoginis in the first millennium CE] brought them into greater prominence and distributed their cult far and wide. [...] The primitive Yogini cult was also revived on account of the increasing influenced of the cult of the Seven Mothers."

Script characters
Matrika (Sanskrit mātṛkā) is also a term used to denote features of Indic scripts (also in combination with aksara, matrikaksara), though there is considerable variation in the precise interpretation of the term from one author to another. Sometimes it denotes a single character, the entire collection of characters (an "alphabet"), the alphabetic "matrix" used as a collation tool, vowels in particular (considered erroneous by Georg Bühler), or the sound of the syllable represented by the character. Various traditions identify the script matrikas with the personified divine Matrikas.

According to K.C. Aryan, the number of Matrikas is determined in the structure of the Devanagari alphabet. First is the (A) group which contains the vowels, then the (Ka), (Cha), (Ta), (ta), (Pa), (Ya) and (Ksha) groups. The seven mother goddesses (Saptamatrikas) correspond to the seven consonant groups; when the vocalic (A) group is added to it, the eight mother goddesses (Ashtamatrikas) are obtained. The Shaktas hold that the Mothers preside over impurities (mala) and over sounds of the language. The Mothers were identified with fourteen vowels plus the anusarva and visarga, making their number sixteen.

In Tantra, the fifty or fifty-one letters including vowels as well as consonants from A to Ksha, of the Devanagari alphabet itself, the Varnamala of bija, have been described as being the Matrikas themselves. It is believed that they are infused with the power of the Divine Mother herself. The Matrikas are considered to be the subtle form of the letters (varna). These letters combined make up syllables (pada) which are combined to make sentences (vakya) and it is of these elements that mantra is composed. It is believed that the power of mantra derives from the fact that the letters of the alphabet are in fact forms of the goddess. The 50 Matrika Kalas are given in the same account as follows: Nivritti, Pratishtha, Vidya, Shanti, Indhika, Dipika, Mochika, Para, Sukshma, Sukshmamrita, Jnanamrita, Apypayani, Vyapini, Vyomarupa, Ananta, Srishti, Riddhi, Smriti, Medha, Kanti, Lakshmi, Dyuti, Sthira, Sthiti, Siddhi, Jada, Palini, Shanti, Aishvarya, Rati, Kamika, Varada, Ahladini, Pritih, Dirgha, Tikshna, Raudri, Bhaya, Nidra, Tandra, Kshudha, Krodhini, Kriya, Utkari, Mrityurupa, Pita, Shveta, Asita, Ananta. Sometimes, the Matrikas represent a diagram written in the letter, believed to possess magical powers.

Worship

In India

According to Leslie C. Orr, the Saptamatrika, who first appeared in South India in the eighth century, had once temples dedicated exclusively to them, but the ninth century onwards, they were demoted to status of "deities of the entourage" (parivara devata) of Shiva. Their images moved from the sanctums to corners of temple complexes and now they are as guardian deities in small village shrines. The Saptamatrikas are worshipped as Sapta kanya (the celestial nymphs) in most South Indian Shiva temples especially in Tamil Nadu. But the Selliyamman temple at Alambakkam in Tiruchirapalli district (In 1909 called Trichonopoly district) is important in worship of the Matrikas. Here once stood a temple dedicated to the Saptamatrika, which was replaced by the present temple. In Tamil Nadu, the matrikas are called as Kannimargal or Saptakannigal and are worshipped in every nook and corner. This worship in Tamil Nadu is very ancient and still in practice for thousands of years..

In south india
The Saptha Kannimar Padal is one of the sub-sections of Arul Nool which was the secondary scripture of Ayyavazhi. This follows the concept of Saptha Kanya.The author of the content is unknown. This contains the event's background and reason for the birth of the seven virgins in the world. Below are the names of Saptha Kannimar:
Brameshwari
Kaumari
Varahi
Vaishnavi
Chamundi
Maheshwari
Indrani

Kannimar Temples in Tamil Nadu
Sri Kannimar thirukkovil is located in Issukazhi katteri, (near Thandarai), Tiruvannamalai. Saptha Kannigal Brahmi, Maheshwari, Kowmaari, Vaishnavi, Indraani, Varaahi and Chaamundi are the deities of this Village, and it is believed that they protect their families and village from diseases, floods, drought and other calamities. They bring prosperity to the people.
Saptha kanniyar sannidhi is separately devoted and built with artistic nuances with natural sceneries and animals pictures painted on the surrounding walls. The terrace is left open unto the sky. This sannidhi is located in Melmaruvathur Aadhiparasakthi Sidhar Peedam, Melmaruvathur.

Sri Kannimar Thiru Kovil is located in Sakkayanayakkanur village which is located on the Sembatti Road which leads to Palani. GPS Coordinate of the Temple (10.233697,77.892362)
The Saptha Kannimar temple is located in Sethumadai village, which is located 25 km from Pollachi Town in Coimbatore District.
Saptha Kannimar ancient temple located at kadathur village, Kallakkurichi t.k, Villuppuram, Tamil Nadu
Saptha Kanniyar temple also located at Uththamar koil near Tiruchirapalli in Tamil Nadu. 
Kannimar Temple located at Tiruchengode Town was built about 200 years ago by the farmers around the temple.
Kannimar temple located at Thiruvallur (dist), Thomur (vill) via Kanakkammachathiram was built in ancient days.
Chennai: Kannimar temple located at Saiva Muthiah 6th Street, Royapettah, Chennai.
Chennai (Velachery): Saptha Kanniyar is also present in Velachery-Baby Nagar-(Gandhi Road - Seethapathy Nagar.) Thiru vedhi Amman temple.
 Saptha Kanni (Chelliamman)in Dandeeswaram.  Heard from locals, it's 300 years old. Opposite Siva temple pond, Velachery. Chennai.
Kannimar Temple located at Vellor district, 2 km inside Ponnai Village, S. N. Palayam: Temple built in the year 2009
Kannimar Temple located in Padalam near Chengalpattu.
Another one is in Manapakkam, also near Chengalpattu.
Saptha Kannimar Temple is located near Sullerumbu Village (Vedasandur to Oddanchatram Road). It is a Kula deivam temple for Soppiyavar Kulam of 24 manai Telugu Chettiar Community
Kannimar Temple is located in Elachipalayam, Karumathampatti, Coimbatore.
Saptha Kannimar temple is located in dharapuram in nattukalpalayam village. It is a Kula deivam temple for pasupulluvaru kulam of Telugu devanga chettiar community. It is a powerful god for the particular kulam community peoples.
An ancient kannimar temple is located near kodumudi. The temple is located at vattakkal valasu near karmandam palayam. this place comes between erode and kodumudi. The temple is an ancient temple and is located on the banks of river Cauvery. The temple is surrounded by evergreen agricultural land. And in the temple, there is a terra cotta statue of the goddesses, which is believed 200plus year old. And it is Kula theivam for Murugan Kothiram, Solamudali Kothiram,
An Kannimar Temple is located in Thottipalayam Village, Near Elumathur in Erode district where all Shaptha Kanni are having individual statues. A very peaceful place.

Kannimar Kothiram of Sengunthar Kaikola Mudaliar community and other Devotees from all over Tamil Nadu frequently visit this temple. Every new moon day there is a grand pooja which is witnessed by a large group of devotees from all over Tamil Nadu. And it is a must visit for all Kannimar devotees.
saptha kannigal in kovilur@ thanjavur district
Saptha Kannigal temple located in Kovilur which is between Punnainallur Mariamman temple and Poondi in Thanjavur district which is believed to be 1000+ years old temple. Chola Kingdom worshiped the god before going to war. This saptha kannigal are one of the parivara devathaigal of kathayee amman is moolavar in the temple. Every pournami homam is conducted here
Sri sapthakannimaar amman in Palavanatham
Temple located near Salem-->Vembadithalam--->Venpalayam worshipped as Kula devivam for Anthelaaru Devanga chettiar.
Kannimar temple nilakkottai taluk, sekkapatty village, jampu odai bank of vaikai river, this temple kulipatti gavaras kuladeivam.
Saptha Kannimar temple is located in Elangaadu village near Thirukkattupalli in Thanjavur district.  It is a Kula deivam for Sozhiya Vellalar Community
Saptha kanniyar temple is located at Kunnaththur, Vellore district. Kula theivam for Sengunthar Kaikola Mudaliyars.(Echchaana Kothiram). Here goddesses are worshipped by regular poojas and special poojas in the month of Aadi and Thai.
Saptha kannimar temple is located in sembiyanmadevi. kallakurichi district (salem-chennai bye pass road).
Saptha kannimar is located in Sendurai, nNatham Tk. DIndigul District.
Saptha kannimar temple is located in ayyampettai. Tanjavur district

Arulmigu Kannimar Samy is worshiped by Sengunthar and jangam community. They have a unique way of worship. They boil rice in seven pots placed one on top of other. Kannimar is represented as locas, sapta swaram and seven energy centres in the human body.

Temples for Sapta Kanya
 Sapta Kanya temple, Velachery,Chennai
 Sapta Kanya temple, Tiruparankundram, Madurai
 Sapta kanya temple, Kannimalarpalayam, Dindigul

In India, shrines of the Saptamatrikas are located in "the wilderness", usually near lakes or rivers, and are made of seven vermilion smeared stones. It is believed that the Matrikas kill fetuses and newborns unless pacified with bridal finery and prayers by women. A prominent Saptamatrika temple is located near Baitarani River, in Jajpur.

The Saptamatrika images are worshipped by women on Pithori – new moon day, with the 64 yoginis represented by rice flour images or supari nuts. The goddesses are worshipped by ceremonial offerings of fruit and flower and mantras.

In Nepal

The Matrikas function both as city protectors and individual protectors in both Hinduism and Buddhism. The Astha matrika are considered as Ajimas (grandmother goddesses, who are feared as bringer of disease and misfortune as well act as protectresses) in the Newar pantheon. Temples (pithas i.e. seats) of the ashta matrika built in and around Kathmandu are considered powerful places of worship.

The pithas are usually open-air shrines, but may be closed structures too. In these pithas, the Matrikas are worshipped with their followers (ganas) in form of stone statues or natural stones, while in dyochems (god-houses) in towns and villages, they are represented in brass images. The brass images (utsav-murtis) are paraded around town and placed at their respective pithas once every year. Like Vishnudharmottara Purana (discussed in Legends), the Matrikas are considered as representing a vice and are worshipped by pithapuja (a pilgrimage around the pithas) to free oneself from them. Though each pitha is primarily dedicated to a Matrika, the other Matrikas are also worshipped as subordinate deities. The pithas, which are "theoretically located at the outer boundaries of the city" are said to form a protective mandala around the city and assisted to a certain compass point. In other temples like the ones dedicated to Pacali Bhairava, the Asthamatrikas are worshipped as a circle of stones. In Bhaktapur, the Ashtamatrikas are believed to the preserver goddesses of the city guarding the eight geometrical directions. Mary Sluser says "Not only do the  guard the compass points but they are also regarded as regents of the sky." Sometimes, they are paired with the Ashta Bhairava (Eight aspects of Bhairava) and sculpted on temple roofs or terraces. Nepali Buddhists worship the Matrikas as described in Dharanisamgrahas.

The Malla king of Nepal Srinivasa Malla built the Patan durbar (court) in 1667 AD and is believed to have seen the Matrikas dance in the durbar one night. The king ordered that the Ashta-matrika be worshipped during the Ashwin Navaratri and cost is defrayed by the durbar. The custom has continued into modern times.

In the Kathmandu valley of Nepal, the Ashta-matrikas with a central village goddess are worshipped as protectors of the city or town. They are identified with the guardians of directions (digpala), places  (lokapala) or lands (kshatrapala), satiated by blood sacrifice. Newar Buddhists associate the Matrikas with 24 human qualities, which can mastered by visiting three sets of eight Matrika pithas.

Tantric worship

The 7th century Sanskrit author Banabhatta mentions the propitiation of Matrikas by a Tantric ascetic in his Harshacharita. The text describes "young nobles [..](of the king) burning themselves with lamps to propitiate the Matrikas in a temple dedicated to the Matrikas. Banabhatta's Kadambari, Bhasa's Cārudatta, Shudraka's Mrichakatika mention the ritual offerings of food and shrines of Matrikas at crossroads. Other offerings include flowers and clothes and meat and wine for some Matrikas. Tantric works like Tantrarāja-Tantra (unknown date, author) and  discuss the worship of Matrikas as Shaktis or letters of the alphabet. A process of this worship, Matrika-nyasa (lit. "installation of the Mothers"), is described in Devi Gita, part of Devi Bhagavata Purana. It involves installation of powers of Matrikas – as letters of the alphabet – in one's body, by "feeling the deity worshipped in different parts of the body" like head, face, anus and legs and reciting mantras. The Hrillekha-matrika-nyasa, a more specialized form of Matrika-nyasa, combines the installation of "most powerful set of all letters (Matrikas)" with the seed syllable  of Goddess Bhuvaneshvari.

Stone inscriptions of Tantric worship of The Matrikas are found in Gangadhar, Rajasthan(by king Vishvavarman- 423 C.E., identified as the first epigraphic evidence of Tantra worship); in Bihar (by Guptas – fifth century) and in Deogarh, Uttar Pradesh (by  – sixth century). The Gangadhar inscripture deals with a construction to a shrine to Chamunda and the other Matrikas, "who are attended by Dakinis (female demons)" and rituals of daily Tantric worship (Tantrobhuta) like the ritual of Bali (offering of grain).

The eight Matrikas are said to reside the second line of bhupura in Sri Chakra. The (1.33) explains that the primary function of Matrikas is to preside eight groups (vargas) of letters of Devanagari alphabet, while Brahmayāmala states they issue originate from the vowels.

Rituals and goals of worship
The Natya Shastra (13.66) recommends worship to Matrikas before setting up the stage and before dance performances. Indra declares in chapter 90 of Devi Purana that the Matrikas are the best among all deities and should be worshipped in cities, villages, towns and shields. Matrikas are generally to be worshipped on all occasions with Navagraha (the nine planets) and the Dikpala (Guardians of the directions) and at night with the Goddess.

The Matsya Purana and Devi Purana prescribe that Matrika shrines should be north-facing and be placed in northern part of a temple-complex. The temples of the Matrikas are found earliest dating to the fourth century and from textual evidence, it is predicated that "there must be impressive shrines all over the [Indian] subcontinent". Although circular Mandalas and Chakras are mentioned in religious texts, most existing shrines are rectangular in nature. Pal speculates that earlier circular shrines, which open to the sky or under trees of less durable material were replaced by the Guptas in stone as rectangular shrines.

The Devi Purana mentions the Matrikas or Deva Shaktis (powers of the gods) as group of seven or more, who should be worshipped for Mukti (liberation) by all, but particularly kings for powers of domination. The Saptamatrika are worshipped for "personal and spiritual renewal" with Mukti as the ultimate goal as well as for powers to control and rule and earthly desires (Bhukti).Also important are the banners of the Saptamatrikas, which are carved outside the Udayagiri caves. These banners are called "Indra's sisters" in the Devi Purana. The Purana lists them as: swan, bull, peacock, conch, discus, elephant and skeleton – attributes of the Matrikas. A king installing these banners is believed to get mukti and bhukti. As per the Nitisara, Matrikas acted as the king's tangible Shaktis and conferred the power to conquer and rule.

See also 
 Devi Kanya Kumari 
 Kaumari
 Kumari (goddess) 
 Kanwari

Notes

References

Sources

External links

Hindu goddesses
Mother goddesses
War goddesses
Childhood goddesses
Shaktism
Newar
Hindu tantric deities